Nin is a surname. Notable people with the surname include:

Alberto Nin Frías (1878-1937), Uruguayan writer
Anaïs Nin (1903–1977), French-born author and diarist
Andrés Nin (1892-1937), Spanish revolutionary
Joaquin Nin (1879-1949), Cuban pianist and composer 
Joaquin Nin-Culmell (1908–2004), Cuban-Spanish composer
Khadja Nin (born 1959), Burundian singer
Rodolfo Nin Novoa (born 1948), Uruguayan politician, former Vice President

See also

Nia (given name)
Nina (name)
Niño (name)
Nino (name)